John Compton (born 27 August 1937 in Poplar, London) is an English former professional footballer. During his career he made over 100 appearances for Ipswich Town between 1960 and 1964.

Honours
Ipswich Town
 Football League First Division: 1961–62
 Football League Second Division: 1960–61

Individual
Ipswich Town Hall of Fame: Inducted 2011

References

External links 
John Compton at Pride of Anglia

1937 births
Living people
Footballers from Poplar, London
Association football defenders
Chelsea F.C. players
Ipswich Town F.C. players
AFC Bournemouth players
English footballers